This is the complete list of Pan American Games medalists in modern pentathlon from 1951 to 2015.

Events

Men's individual

Men's team

Men's relay

Women's individual

Women's relay

Mixed relay

References

Modern pentathlon